The Megalodontesidae (until recently spelled Megalodontidae, a name already in use for a family of fossil molluscs) are a small family of sawflies, containing a single living genus, Megalodontes, with some 40 species restricted to the temperate regions of Eurasia. Larvae of Megalodontesidae feed on herbaceous plants. They are distinguished from the closely related Pamphiliidae by their serrate or pectinate antennae.

In 2016, a phylogenetic analysis of the superfamily Pamphilioidea found that the extinct family Praesiricidae was paraphyletic with respect to Megalodontesidae, so Praesiricidae was proposed as a synonym of Megalodontesidae.

Genera
As of 2016, the following genera belong to the family Megalodontesidae, divided into four subfamilies:

 Subfamily Megalodontesinae  (synonym: Rudisiriciinae )
 †Aulidontes 
 †Jibaissodes 
 Megalodontes 
 †Rudisiricius 
 Subfamily Archoxyelydinae 
 †Archoxyelyda 
 †Xyelydontes 
 Subfamily Decorisiricinae 
 †Brevisiricius 
 †Decorisiricius 
 †Limbisiricius 
 Subfamily Praesiricinae 
 †Praesirex 
 †Turgidontes 
 Incertae sedis
 †Hoplitolyda 
 †Sinosepulca

References

 Biolib
 Naturspaziergang
 Aramel.free.fr
 R.B. Benson: Handbook for the identification of British insects. Vol IV: Hymenoptera. 2. Symphyta Section a. Published by the Royal Entomological Society of London, 1951.

Sawfly families
Sawflies
Pamphilioidea
Taxa named by Friedrich Wilhelm Konow